Caput mortuum (plural capita mortua) is a Latin term whose literal meaning is "dead head" or "worthless remains", used in alchemy.

Caput mortuum (alternately called nigredo) signified a useless substance left over from a chemical operation such as sublimation and the epitome of decline and decay; alchemists represented this residue with a stylized human skull, a literal death's head.

The symbol shown on this page was also used in 18th-century chemistry to mean residue, remainder, or residuum. Caput mortuum was also sometimes used to mean crocus metallorum, i.e. brownish-red metallic compounds such as crocus martis (ferrous sulfate), and crocus veneris (copper oxidule).

References

Alchemical substances
Latin words and phrases